The Belgian Railways Class 18 was a type of electric locomotive operated by NMBS/SNCB of Belgium. They have been displaced from these workings by Thalys electric multiple units and were all retired from service by 1999. They were derived from the French SNCF CC 40100 express passenger locomotives. Their multi-voltage capabilities allowed them to work beyond Belgium's borders, mainly Paris - Brussels/Liège and Oostende - Cologne.

The locomotives had an aluminum body with dark blue accents.

Status
The dispositions of locomotives in this class are as follows:
 1801 Scrapped in February 2008 at Salzinnes works
 1802 Scrapped in July 2009 at Courcelles-Motte
 1803 Stored at Raeren, moved to Sokolov, Czech Republic in October 2011, scrapped in February 2012
 1804 Scrapped in July 2009 at Courcelles-Motte
 1805 Preserved by PFT
 1806 Stored at Raeren, moved to Sokolov, Czech Republic in October 2011, scrapped in February 2012

References

 Locomotives de la série 18
 The Railfaneurope.net Picture Gallery - Directory: /pix/be/electric/historic/18
 SNCB série 18

Extermal links

Alstom locomotives
C′C′ locomotives
Electric locomotives of Belgium
National Railway Company of Belgium locomotives
Railway locomotives introduced in 1973
Standard gauge locomotives of Belgium
1500 V DC locomotives
3000 V DC locomotives
15 kV AC locomotives
25 kV AC locomotives